Mohammad Kathem Rashid Maruf Sawalha (born 1961), also known by the name Abu Obada, is a political activist. He is the president of the British Muslim Initiative (BMI) and currently resides in London, to which he fled from the West Bank in 1990, to escape the Israeli regime that was targeting those resisting its occupation.

Before emigrating to the UK, Sawalha was Hamas’s West Bank military chief. In addition, he is accused of supervising the allocation and supply of large amounts of money to Hamas operatives, an allegation that led to his being named in a 2004 U.S. indictment against Hamas operative Muhammad Salah.

In addition to his work with Hamas and BMI, Sawalha is a frequent guest on the Al-Hiwar television station, and is affiliated with numerous Palestinian and Islamic charities. He has had a hand in organizing several of the flotillas and land convoys attempting to reach the Gaza Strip, through which he has transferred financial aid to help the besieged Palestinian people. Sawalha helped found the Muslim Association of Britain and was also requested by the London's Metropolitan Police to become a trustee of the Finsbury Park Mosque. In addition, he signed the 2009 Istanbul Declaration, which reaffirms resistance as a valid means to oppose Israeli state terrorism, illegal occupation and war crimes against the civilian Palestinian population.

Early life and education
Sawalha was born in Tubas, West Bank, in 1961. Sawalha studied religion at Amman University beginning in 1980.

Early activities in the West Bank
In 1988, after studying at Amman University, Sawalha returned to the West Bank, where he lived in Al-Bireh until 1990. He taught at a religious school in Al-Ram and later at the Islamic college (Kuliyat al-Da’wah) in Jerusalem and in Beit Hanina.

Sawalha was a senior Hamas activist in the West Bank, and helped establish Hamas' West Bank headquarters in 1989-90. He also instructed regional Hamas commanders to set up resistance networks, establishing links between local operatives who had not yet been detained and operatives in the United States. After the discovery of the resistance infrastructure in the West Bank, Israeli occupation forces targeted him. In October 1990 he managed to escape to Jordan and from there moved on to Britain. He continues to carry out anti-Israeli-occupation activities from there.

Activities in Britain
During his first years in Britain, Sawalha continued his  political activities opposing the illegal Israeli occupation of Palestine. He maintained contact with operatives in the United States, Syria and the West Bank.

He was a founder of the Muslim Association of Britain (MAB), and ran it from 1999 to 2007. Later he served as chairman of the British Muslim Initiative. He was described on a Palestinian website as head of the International Committee to Lift the Siege on the Gaza Strip. In 2009 he reportedly was named deputy chairman of the Popular Committee in Support of the Palestinian People. He also signed the 2009 Istanbul Declaration affirming the Palestinian peoples right to resist the illegal Israeli occupation of their land.

Sawalha has been involved in organizing flotillas and land convoys to the Gaza Strip while in Britain. Additionally, a BBC program alleged that he had directed funds both for Hamas' armed and missionary wings.

Sawalha has been engaged in lawfare against Israel, which takes advantage of Britain's universal jurisdiction law to file criminal complaints against Israeli officials involved the Israeli regimes war crimes, breach of Geneva Conventions and defiance of UN resolutions.

2004 U.S. indictment of Salah
A Department of Justice press release names Sawalha as a co-conspirator in the 2004 indictment of Muhammad Salah. Among the aliases mentioned in the indictment are “Muhammad Khadhem Sawalha,” “Abu Obeida,” “Abu Ubada,” “Abu Ubaydah,” “Abu Ubeida,” and “Abu Obadah”. It was alleged that Saleh met and spoke with Abu Marzook and Sawalha, who had been in charge of Hamas operations within the West Bank, regarding the need for a resurgence in Hamas operations in the West Bank. It was alleged that during the meeting, Sawalha identified specific Hamas members who could be used to revitalize Hamas's activities, including Awadallah and Saleh al-Arouri. Sawalha allegedly told Salah on several occasion to provide money to Hamas operatives on the West Bank, and Salah passed along information to Sawalha as well. Around December 1992, a U.S.-based Hamas member gave pictures of co-conspirator Adel Awadallah, who was on the run from Israeli occupation authorities, to Salah so that Salah could have a false passport made for Awadallah. Sawalha reportedly told Salah explicit instructions as to how to dress and behave when distributing funds to local Hamas operatives.

It further alleged on January 13, 1993, en route from the U.S. to the Middle East, Salah met in London with Sawalha, who instructed Salah to provide money to various Hamas members. Salah was eventually indicted for his Hamas role, and in January 1995 pleaded guilty to participating in Hamas affairs, saying that he had represented Sawalha and had been appointed head of military operations in the West Bank at the request of Abu Marzook and Sawalha. Another allegation mentioned in the indictment noted the provision of $400,000 to one 'Brother Mohammed Kadhim,' an alias for Sawalha.

Assassination of Sheikh Yassin
Sawalha spoke out in 2004 against Israel's assassination of Sheikh Yassin, the spiritual leader of Hamas, saying that Shaykh Ahmad Yassin “lived with his people and died in the service of their cause.”

British Muslim Initiative
Sawalha is one of the founders of the BMI, which describes itself as follows: “Formed by justice, peace and human rights campaigners, the British Muslim Initiative (BMI) is an organisation which seeks to fight racism and Islamophobia, combat the challenges Muslims face around the world, encourage Muslim participation in British public life, and improve relations between the West and the Muslim world.” The BMI supported the Global March to Jerusalem.
 
In 2009, demonstrators protesting the Gaza attacks clashed with police, and nearly all of the handful arrested were Muslims. Sawalha questioned this disproportion, and also questioned the detainees' treatment. He said the BMI “encourages Muslims to express their feelings and ambitions and frustrations only through political and legal processes. But if anything sends the message that Muslims cannot express themselves through political processes, and they will not be dealt with like others, it will give more strength to the fringes within the community who say democracy and the political system doesn't apply to Muslims in this country. This will only increase the frustration and sense of alienation among these people.”

Sawalha and the BMI supported the January 2012 developments in Bangladesh, condemning the International Crimes Tribunal.

Gaza flotillas
After the 2009 Gaza flotilla, Sawalha said that the next convoy would avoid the type of confrontation that had occurred with Egypt: “the confrontation will be directly with the Zionist enemy itself on the high seas.” Sawalha organized the autumn 2010 LifeLine 5 convoy to Gaza, which reportedly delivered $5 million of aid to the elected Palestinian government to benefit the besieged people.

References

Palestinian emigrants to the United Kingdom
1961 births
Living people
Hamas members